Darrin Shane Mooney (born 26 April 1967) is an English musician and session drummer, best known for his work with Primal Scream and Gary Moore.

Mooney started playing at the age of 12 at school. Throughout his school years, he played in various school bands and orchestras, playing both drums and percussion. At the age of 18 Darrin went along to a NYJO (National Youth Jazz Orchestra) rehearsal in London and was inspired as he watched the others play.

He was an official member of electro-rock band Babylon Zoo (1996–1999)

In 1997 he joined Primal Scream and worked with Gary Moore from 2001. He has also played with China Black, Matt Bianco, Ragga Twins, Bonnie Tyler, Martin Barre and others.

Discography
 1996 – Martin Barre – The Meeting
 1996 – Babylon Zoo – The Boy With the X-Ray Eyes
 1998 – Primal Scream – Badlands
 1998 – Judie Tzuke – Over the Moon
 1998 – Colin Blunstone – The Light Inside
 1998 – Massive Attack/Primal Scream – "Teardrop" (remix)
 1999 – The Mighty Strynth – What Is It
 1999 – Babylon Zoo – King Kong Groover
 2000 – Ian Anderson – The Secret Language of Birds
 2000 – Primal Scream/Paul Weller – "When the Kingdom Comes"
 2000 – Primal Scream – XTRMNTR
 2001 – Gary Moore – Back to the Blues
 2002 – Scars – Scars
 2002 – Primal Scream – Evil Heat
 2003 – Primal Scream – Dirty Hits
 2003 – Primal Scream – Live in Japan
 2003 – Queens of the Stoneage/Unkle – "No One Knows" (remix)
 2003 – Skin – Flesh Wounds
 2003 – Gary Moore's Scars – Live at Monsters of Rock
 2003 – Gary Moore's Scars – Live at Monsters of Rock (DVD)
 2003 – Martin Barre – Stage Left
 2004 – Primal Scream – Shoot Speed – More Dirty Hits
 2004 – Bent – Now I Must Remember
 2004 – Deepest Blue – "Can't Believe"
 2004 – Deepest Blue – "Shooting Star"
 2004 – Gary Moore – Power of the Blues
 2004 – Shaznay Lewis – Heart Made Me a Fool
 2006 – Primal Scream – "Riot City Blues"
 2006 – Primal Scream – "Gamblin' Bar Room Blues"
 2006 – Primal Scream – "It's Not Enough"
 2006 – Primal Scream – "To Live is to Fly"
 2006 – Primal Scream – "Bloods"
 2006 – Primal Scream – "Zeppelin Blues"
 2006 – Gary Moore – Old New Ballads Blues
 2006 – Cliff Richard/Dionne Warwick – "Anyone Who Had A Heart"
 2007 – Queens of the Stoneage/Primal Scream – "I’m Designer" (remix)
 2007 – Primal Scream – Riot City Blues (Live DVD)
 2007 – Dust Galaxy – Dust Galaxy
 2007 – Leanne Harte – Leanne Harte
 2008 – Primal Scream – "Beautiful Future"
 2008 – Primal Scream – "Time of the Assassins"
 2008 – Primal Scream – "Jesus is My Aeroplane"
 2008 – Primal Scream – "Can't Go Back"
 2008 – Primal Scream – "Diamonds, Fur Coats, Champagne"
 2008 – Primal Scream – "Urban Guerilla"
 2008 – Primal Scream – "I Call My Baby Pussycat"
 2008 – Primal Scream – "I Want You"
 2008 – Primal Scream – "The Fire of Love"
 2008 – Primal Scream – "The Train Kept a Rollin'"
 2008 – Don Airey – "A Light in the Sky"
 2008 – Oasis/Primal Scream – "The Shock of the Lightning"
 2008 – David Holmes – Holy Pictures
 2011 – Dionne Bromfield – "Yeah Right"
 2011 – Dionne Bromfield – "Do You Remember Our Love"
 2011 – Dionne Bromfield – "Mugging"
 2011 – Dionne Bromfield – "That's The Way You Wonna Play"
 2011 – Wonderland – "What Do You Want"
 2011 – Wonderland – "In Your Arms"
 2011 – Gary Moore – Live at Montreux 2010
 2013 – Primal Scream – More Light
 2016 – Primal Scream – Chaosmosis

References

External links
 
 Darrin Mooney Discography at Music Advisor
 Darrin Mooney at Sonnet 155
 Darrin Mooney at The World's Greatest Drummer

1967 births
Living people
Primal Scream members
English rock drummers
British male drummers
English session musicians
People from the London Borough of Merton
Musicians from London